Welcome to the Masquerade is the fifth studio album by Canadian Christian hard rock band Thousand Foot Krutch. It was released on September 8, 2009. Trevor McNevan, the band's frontman, has stated, "Yeah, I think the new record is definitely more aggressive. In some areas, it's the heaviest we've ever been." The album entered the Billboard 200 at No. 35  and the Christian Album charts at No. 2.

Musical style and concept
"The inspiration behind the album comes from people hiding things in their life," McNevan has stated, "Masquerading through life, hiding their frustrations."

"Each song is kind of dealing with those different situations. Some of it is just saying, 'I've been through this, and this is how I found hope in this situation."

"A lot of our peers are getting a little poppier, and I understand that and appreciate it," stated McNevan. "I just felt like for us, it was the right time to step in the other direction. It’s big crunchy rock and roll."

“Between the economy and everything else, this is as good a time as has ever been to drop our stereotypes — all the stuff that separates us — and get down to the black and white of loving people as God intended it to be,” McNevan suggests.

Guests
Welcome to the "Masquerade features multiple performers. Aaron Sprinkle returned as the band's producer, from producing the band's previous record Phenomenon, alongside Trevor McNevan. Matt Carter of Emery assisted with McNevan early in 2009. Phil X, who had recorded guitars for the two previous Thousand Foot Krutch records, did not return for this album. However, Randy Torres recorded "some sweet licks" on the record according to a Tooth & Nail podcast. Guitar duties were also shared by McNevan, Sprinkle and a third guest Pete Stewart, who recorded the guitar solo near the end of the song "Fire it Up". Stewart surprisingly entered the studio with TFK despite the fact that he no longer considers himself a Christian. The band additionally hired Randy Staub to mix "Welcome to the Masquerade"; Staub is famous for mixing Metallica's record The Black Album.

Reception
"Fire It Up" has already been praised as a hit with a similar potential to "Rawkfist" and "Move" with Tyler Hess of ChristianMusicZine.com describing it as "vintage Thousand Foot Krutch, with obvious arena play potential".

C.E. Moore of TheChristianManifesto.com described the song "as everything you've come to love about the band. It's a raucous number that will get your heart pumping, your feet moving, and your head banging. 'Fire It Up' fires on all cylinders."

Roger Gelwicks of Jesusfreakhideout praised the album on his review "TFK dons a more produced approach to hard rock this time around while at the same time maintaining the unrestrained and raucous vibe the band is known for. And this being the fifth album from the Canadian band, there's a progression here that many old and new fans have waited to hear," he stated.

Allmusic.com also had high praise for the album "the band's full-scale audio assault makes it difficult to imagine that they could ever top the crystal-clear production and deliberate crunch of Masquerade. Each track is propelled by muscular riffs, fighting its way into permanent memory alongside the greatest mainstream rock bands of the decade," their review states.

"Fire It Up" has peaked at No. 35 on the Billboard Rock charts while "Bring Me to Life" has peaked at number No. 2 on Christian Rock radio.

"Forward Motion" has reached No. 48 on the Billboard Christian Songs charts.

Release and promotion
"Bring Me To Life" was available for free download during June 2009 from the band's site if an email address was provided.

Both "Fire It Up" and "Bring Me To Life" were added to the band's live set list before the album was released. "Bring Me To Life" was first played live at Ignite Alaska in Fairbanks, Alaska, where the band performed the song as their encore. McNevan said that it was the first time the band had played a song live that had not already been released on an album. They also played "Fire It Up" at Wonder Jam in June 2009.

The band announced a Fall 2009 tour to support Welcome to The Masquerade, sharing the stage with Jars of Clay, AA Talks, B.Reith, FM Static and This Beautiful Republic.

The album was made for pre-order on July 24, 2009, and was released on September 8, 2009 without delay.

The trailer for the album was released on August 3. It featured a 45-second clip of the song "Welcome to the Masquerade".

"Fire It Up" is featured in NHL 10 and MX vs. ATV Reflex video game. It is also featured in the G.I. Joe: The Rise of Cobra trailer.

"Fire It Up" has also been released for download on the Rock Band music store.

On September 3, 2009, on the Tooth and Nail podcast, McNevan confirmed that a music video was in pre-production for "Fire It Up".

"Scream" was used as the introduction music for Harrison Ford at the 2009 Scream Awards.

"Invitation/Welcome to the Masquerade" was used for the 2010 Detroit Red Wings Stanley Cup Playoff video played before each game at Joe Louis Arena. It was also the music video for 2009's video game Marvel Ultimate Alliance 2:Fusion.

"Fire It Up" is the theme tune of the Backdraft monster truck, driven by Jeremy Slifko.

A fan edition of Welcome to the Masquerade came out on October 11, 2011. It contained three new tracks, including "Shook", "Take it Out on Me" and "Anyone Else".

Track listing

Singles
"Bring Me to Life" was released as the album's lead single on April 22, 2009.
"Forward Motion" was released as a radio single on May 17, 2009.
"Fire It Up" was released to mainstream rock radio on July 28, 2009.
"Already Home" - was released on January 6, 2010.
"E for Extinction" was released on June 28, 2010.
"Look Away" was released to Christian CHR in August 2010.

Charts

Awards

In 2010, the album was nominated for a Dove Award for Rock Album of the Year at the 41st GMA Dove Awards.

Personnel
 Trevor McNevan - vocals, guitars
 Joel Bruyere - bass guitar
 Steve Augustine - drums
 Producer, additional guitars and keyboards: Aaron Sprinkle
 Mixed by Randy Staub
 Additional guitar on "Fire It Up": Pete Stewart
 Additional guitars: Randy Torres
 All songs written by Trevor McNevan, Steve Augustine and Joel Bruyere

References

External links
 album list at Tooth & Nail website

2009 albums
Thousand Foot Krutch albums
Tooth & Nail Records albums
Albums produced by Aaron Sprinkle

fr:Welcome to the Masquerade